Jonny Dodge  (born 30 June 1982) is a British F1, events, aviation & superyacht entrepreneur and founder of the Dodgeball Rally. He has been called the 'Superyacht Influencer' in Forbes Magazine.

Early life and education 
Dodge was born in Dorset, and grew up in Wincanton, England.  He is the son of a furniture maker. Dodge gained a first class Hons Degree in Product Design at The University of Plymouth, followed by a master's degree at Central St. Martins College of Art and Design in London in 2007.

Early career 
After graduation Dodge went on to organise a boat rally called The BladeRun. He went on to work on the Gumball 3000, and then invested in the Mayfair based nightclub Aura Mayfair with his business partner Tony Fernandes. In January 2011, Madonna held talk on investing in the club after her numerous visits and meetings with owners.

Dodgeball Rally started in 2009 and is a bi-annual supercar rally in several European countries. Dodge also founded Concours d'Elegance at the Hurlingham Club, and hosted parties with celebrities such as Jimmy Choo

Dodge's F1 career started in 2010 when he put on Grand Prix Ball at Hurlingham Club prior to the British Grand Prix at Silverstone, his company GP Management also ran F1 Rocks parties in several countries, with artists such as Eminem, Jessie J, and Jay Kay.

Charity Work 

Dodge is a philanthropist and support of the The Prince's Trust through his gala dinner in London the Grand Prix Ball

Other activities 

He has been an astronaut in training with Zero Gravity Corporation , and is signed up for Virgin Galactic promoting is business for holidays in Space

References

External links 
 

1982 births
English businesspeople
English motorsport people
Living people
Auto racing executives
Alumni of Central Saint Martins
Alumni of the University of Plymouth
People from Wincanton